Toujours de nous (meaning Always from Us) is the twelfth studio album by Canadian singer Mario Pelchat. It was released on October 19, 2010 by Musicor.

Track listing

References

External links 
 
 

2010 albums
Mario Pelchat albums